Clifton Ryan (born February 18, 1984) is a former American football defensive tackle. He was originally drafted by the St. Louis Rams in the fifth round (154th overall) of the 2007 NFL Draft. He played collegiately at Michigan State.

Early years
Ryan went to High School at Arthur Hill High School in Saginaw, Michigan, where he finished with 310 tackles and 12 sacks.

College career
Ryan played college football at Michigan State where he played in 50 games, making 35 starts and finished his career with 118 tackles and 10.5 sacks. As a senior, he totaled 25 tackles, six for losses and four sacks.  As a sophomore, he had 41 tackles (eight for a loss) and 2.5 sacks. He majored in Kinesiology.

Professional career

Pre-draft measurables

St. Louis Rams
Ryan was selected by the St. Louis Rams in the fifth round (154th overall) of the 2007 NFL Draft. On July 14, 2007, the St. Louis Rams agreed to terms with Ryan on a three-year $1.24 million contract that included a $129,000 signing bonus. In his debut season he played in all 16 games finishing the season with 30 tackles and two sacks. He was not re-signed following the 2010 season and became a free agent on March 17, 2011. His career was cut short due to concussions.

External links
Rams Player Bio

References

1984 births
Sportspeople from Saginaw, Michigan
American football defensive tackles
Michigan State Spartans football players
St. Louis Rams players
Living people